1234 is the second studio album by Propaganda. Released in 1990, Michael Mertens was the only remaining member of the group from their previous album A Secret Wish, though original member Susanne Freytag made a guest appearance on two tracks, and the album includes some songs co-written by Ralf Dörper. New group members included Derek Forbes and Brian McGee, both formerly of Simple Minds and whom had both toured with the first incarnation of the band, and vocalist Betsi Miller. The album was produced by Ian Stanley and Chris Hughes, most notable for their work with Tears For Fears in the 1980s. Hughes and Miller would later marry.

The first single from the album, "Heaven Give Me Words", reached the UK Top 40 and also reached #22 on the U.S. Adult Contemporary chart. "Your Wildlife" reached #32 on the U.S. Dance Music/Club Play Singles chart. Both songs were co-written by Howard Jones. Another single, "Only One Word" (which featured Pink Floyd guitarist David Gilmour), peaked at #71 in the UK.

The album itself peaked at #46 on the UK Album Chart.

The cover art is a close-up of part of the statue Unique Forms of Continuity in Space by Umberto Boccioni

Track listing

Personnel
Betsi Miller - vocals
Michael Mertens - keyboards, electronics
Derek Forbes - bass guitar
Ian Stanley - Fairlight synthesizer
Chris Hughes - computer
Brian McGee - drums
with:
Neil Taylor, Andy Ross, David Gilmour - guitar
Ross Cullum - rhythm guitar
David Paton, Pino Palladino - bass guitar
Jürgen Dahmen - keyboards
Andy Richards, Blue Weaver - Fairlight synthesizer
Simon Clark - Hammond organ, keyboards
Greg Hawkes - synthesizer
Mel Collins - soprano saxophone
Alan Lee Kirkendale - trumpet
Susanne Freytag - voice on Vicious Circle and Ministry of Fear
Howard Jones, Tessa Niles - backing vocals
Yasmin Hashmi - Synclavier programming

References

1990 albums
Propaganda (band) albums
Albums produced by Chris Hughes (musician)
Albums produced by Ian Stanley
Virgin Records albums